Wang Kuan-hsiung was a Taiwanese actor who was a well-known and popular leading man in the kung fu film genre of the 1970s and 1980s.

Career 
Wang is mostly known for his role as Chan Ming Lung aka "The Iron Ox" in Iron Ox, The Tiger's Killer (1974), which is a tale about a student taking on a group of men, the Five Tigers, in duels to avenge  the death of his teacher. This film also featured a well-known actor of the genre, Wong Fei-Lung. Other films in a similar vein around the same time were Two Dragons Against Tiger (1974) and Chase Step By Step (1975).

Wang's early films include Kung Fu Queen, Chaochow Guy, Chase Step by Step, Iron Ox The Tiger's Killer (aka The Angry Fist), and Two Dragons Against Tiger, which were all "old school" type of kung fu films that were produced in the 1970s.

Wang received a Golden Horse Award for the film White Jasmine, aka Mo li hua, a 1980 film that also starred Sylvia Chang.

Wang later branched out to writing and directing films that included Lewd Lizard (1979) and Yellow Skin (1985), as well as some production work.

Wang retired from the film business in 1984.

His filmography is somewhat confusing and may be more extensive than most sites and reference books indicate. However, he has appeared in over 40 movies and is credited under a multitude of names, including:

Champ Wang 
Frank Wong
Goon-Hung Wong 
Jacky Wong 
Kuan-hsing Wang
Kuan Hsiung Huang
Wang Kuan Hsing
Wang Kwn-Shong
Wong Goon-Hung
Wong Gwan-Sheong
Wong Koon Hung
Wong Kwan-Hsiung

References

External links

Wang Kuan-Hsiung at Cinemasie database
Wang Kuan Hsiung at Hong Kong Cinemagic
Wang Kuan Hsiung at Simon Yam website
Wong Goon-Hung at Hkmdb

1950 births
Living people
Taiwanese male film actors